Sean Fallon may refer to:

 Sean Fallon (footballer) (1922–2013), Irish footballer
 Seán Fallon (politician) (1937–1995), Irish Fianna Fáil politician